Wubin is located in the northern Wheatbelt region of Western Australia,  north-northeast of Perth and  north of Dalwallinu.

Wubin was originally approved as a siding name on the proposed Wongan Hills to Mullewa railway line in April 1913, land also being set aside and a townsite gazetted the same year. The first lots in the townsite were sold in June 1914, and the railway line opened in 1915. Wubin derives its name from the Aboriginal name for a nearby water source, Woobin Well, first recorded by a surveyor in 1907. The spelling Wubin was adopted to conform with spelling rules for Aboriginal names adopted by the Lands & Surveys Department.

In 1936 Co-operative Bulk Handling Ltd converted the siding to grain bulk handling, installing diesel powered bucket elevators to replace the system of manhandling grain onto rail wagons in hessian sacks.

Wubin flourished like most farming towns during the post World War II era; during that time an all-weather road was constructed across Lake Moore to Paynes Find substantially reducing travel times north to the mining areas in the Murchison and Pilbara regions.  It is this road, part of the Great Northern Highway, that is now the economic heart of the town.

In 2007 the Wubin Primary School, established 18 August 1919, was closed by the Department of Education as a result of falling enrolments.

References

Further reading

External links

Towns in Western Australia
Grain receival points of Western Australia
Shire of Dalwallinu